Hans Stringer (born July 6, 1987) is a Dutch mixed martial artist who last competed in 2016.

Background
Growing up in the Netherlands, Stringer began training in kickboxing in 2003, and mixed martial arts a year later.  Stringer spent some time studying to become an electrician before deciding to make a career as a fighter.

Stringer holds a first degree black belt in Brazilian Jiu Jitsu and teaches at Jiu Jitsu Factory The Netherlands.

Mixed martial arts career

Early career
After a 5-0 amateur career, Stringer made his professional debut at the age of 18 in 2005. Over the next several years he competed primarily in the light heavyweight division in regional promotions all over Europe.  He was able to compile a record of 21-5-3, before making an appearance for the World Series of Fighting on October 26, 2013.  After that fight, Stringer was signed by the UFC in February 2014.

Ultimate Fighting Championship
Stringer made his promotional debut against Francimar Barroso on March 23, 2014 at UFC Fight Night 38. Stringer won the back-and-forth fight via split decision.

Stringer next faced Fábio Maldonado on October 25, 2014 at UFC 179. He lost the fight via TKO in the second round.

Stringer faced Ilir Latifi on July 18, 2015 at UFC Fight Night 72.  He lost the fight via knockout in the first round. Following back to back losses, Stringer was released from the promotion.

Personal life
He currently owns a gym called Exist in Ijsselstein, the Netherlands.

Mixed martial arts record

|-
|Loss
|align=center|22–8–3
|Muslim Makhmudov
|KO (punch to the body)
| |ACB 45: Siberia vs. Caucasus
|
|align=center|1
|align=center|2:22
|St. Petersburg, Russia
|
|-
|Loss
|align=center|22–7–3
|Ilir Latifi
|KO (punches)
|UFC Fight Night: Bisping vs. Leites 
|
|align=center|1
|align=center|0:56
|Glasgow, Scotland
|
|-
| Loss
| align=center| 22–6–3
| Fábio Maldonado
| TKO (punches)
| UFC 179
| 
| align=center| 2
| align=center| 4:06
| Rio de Janeiro, Brazil
| 
|-
| Win
| align=center| 22–5–3
| Francimar Barroso
| Decision (split)
| UFC Fight Night: Shogun vs. Henderson 2
| 
| align=center| 3
| align=center| 5:00
| Natal, Brazil
| 
|-
| Draw
| align=center| 21–5–3
| Francisco France
| Draw (unanimous)
| WSOF 6
| 
| align=center| 3
| align=center| 5:00
| Coral Gables, Florida, United States
| 
|-
| Win
| align=center| 21–5–2
| Marius Panin
| TKO (punches)
| Team Super Pro: Sport Center Gala 2
| 
| align=center| 1
| align=center| 1:46
| Zevenbergen, Netherlands
| 
|-
| Win
| align=center| 20–5–2
| Michal Fijalka
| Decision (unanimous)
| MMA Attack 2
| 
| align=center| 3
| align=center| 5:00
| Katowice, Poland
| 
|-
| Win
| align=center| 19–5–2
| Sorin Florea
| TKO (punches)
| Team Super Pro: Sport Center Gala
| 
| align=center| 1
| align=center| 2:40
| Zevenbergen, Netherlands
| 
|-
| Win
| align=center| 19–5–2
| Zsolt Balla
| TKO (punches)
| Beast of the East 15
| 
| align=center| 1
| align=center| 3:02 
| Zutphen, Netherlands
| 
|-
| Draw
| align=center| 18–5–2
| Attila Végh
| Draw (unanimous)
| Nitrianska Noc Bojovnikov 3
| 
| align=center| 3
| align=center| 5:00
| Nitra, Slovakia
| 
|-
| Loss
| align=center| 17–5–1
| Joseph Billstein
| Decision (unanimous)
| Tempel Fight School: Mix Fight Gala XI
| 
| align=center| 2
| align=center| 5:00
| Sindelfingen, Germany
| 
|-
| Win
| align=center| 17–4–1
| Michal Fijalka
| Technical Submission (kimura)
| Beast of the East: Grabowski vs. Kita
| 
| align=center| 1
| align=center| 1:51
| Gdynia, Poland
| 
|-
| Win
| align=center| 16–4–1
| Milan Hasanzadah
| TKO (punches)
| Team Super Pro: 10th Anniversary
| 
| align=center| 1
| align=center| N/A
| Nijmegen, Netherlands
| 
|-
| Win
| align=center| 15–4–1
| Michael Knapp
| Decision (split)
| Beast of the East: Chahbari vs. Souwer
| 
| align=center| 2
| align=center| 5:00
| Zutphen, Netherlands
|Heavyweight bout.
|-
| Win
| align=center| 14–4–1
| Dawid Baziak
| TKO (punches)
| Tempel Fight School: Mix Fight Gala IX
| 
| align=center| 1
| align=center| 1:39
| Darmstadt, Germany
| 
|-
| Win
| align=center| 13–4–1
| Arnoldas Joknys
| TKO (punches)
| Beast of the East 12
| 
| align=center| 1
| align=center| N/A
| Gdynia, Poland
| 
|-
| Win
| align=center| 12–4–1
| Nills van Noord
| Submission (triangle armbar)
| Ultimate Glory 11
| 
| align=center| 1
| align=center| 2:20
| Amsterdam, Netherlands
| 
|-
| Win
| align=center| 11–4–1
| Yuji Sakaragi
| TKO (punches)
| DEEP: 43
| 
| align=center| 2
| align=center| 2:11
| Tokyo, Japan
| 
|-
| Loss
| align=center| 10–4–1
| Andre Fyeet
| KO (punches)
| Gentlemen Fight Night 4
| 
| align=center| 1
| align=center| N/A
| Tilburg, Netherlands
| 
|-
| Win
| align=center| 10–3–1
| Krzysztof Kulak
| Decision (unanimous)
| Beast of the East 11
| 
| align=center| 2
| align=center| 5:00
| Zutphen, Netherlands
| 
|-
| Win
| align=center| 9–3–1
| Soltan Burdas
| Submission (triangle choke)
| K.O. Events: Tough Is Not Enough
| 
| align=center| 1
| align=center| N/A
| Rotterdam, Netherlands
| 
|-
| Win
| align=center| 8–3–1
| Don Rocco
| Decision (unanimous)
| Ultimate Glory 8
| 
| align=center| 3
| align=center| 5:00
| Nijmegen, Netherlands
|Heavyweight bout.
|-
| Win
| align=center| 7–3–1
| Ricardo Van Kooten
| TKO (punches)
| Beast of the East 10
| 
| align=center| 1
| align=center| N/A
| Zutphen, Netherlands
| 
|-
| Win
| align=center| 6–3–1
| Marco Biswana
| Submission (rear-naked choke)
| Ultimate Glory 7
| 
| align=center| 1
| align=center| 1:24
| Amersfoort, Netherlands
| 
|-
| Loss
| align=center| 5–3–1
| Bastien Huveneers
| Decision (unanimous)
| Klash Champions Battlefield 4
| 
| align=center| 2
| align=center| 5:00
| Netherlands
| 
|-
| Win
| align=center| 5–2–1
| Adrian Stoiti
| Submission (rear-naked choke)
| Klash Champions Battlefield 3
| 
| align=center| 1
| align=center| 4:09
| Sibiu, Romania
| 
|-
| Draw
| align=center| 4–2–1
| Sbigniev Romanovskij
| Draw (unanimous)
| Bushido Lithuania
| 
| align=center| 2
| align=center| 5:00
| Siauliai, Lithuania
|Return to Light Heavyweight.
|-
| Loss
| align=center| 4–2
| Dion Staring
| Decision (unanimous)
| Ultimate Glory 7
| 
| align=center| 3
| align=center| 5:00
| Amersfoort, Netherlands
| 
|-
| Win
| align=center| 4–1
| Marton Marton
| Submission (choke)
| Gentlemen Fight Night 2
| 
| align=center| 1
| align=center| N/A
| Tilburg, Netherlands
|Light Heavyweight bout.
|-
| Win
| align=center| 3–1
| Stjepan Bekavac
| Submission (armbar)
| Kam Lung 5
| 
| align=center| 1
| align=center| N/A
| Zuidland, Netherlands
|Heavyweight debut.
|-
| Win
| align=center| 2–1
| Matteo Pirran
| TKO (strikes)
| King of Kings
| 
| align=center| 2
| align=center| N/A
| Milan, Italy
|
|-
| Loss
| align=center| 1–1
| Igor Araújo
| Submission (triangle choke)
| Shooto Holland: Playing With Fire
| 
| align=center| 1
| align=center| 1:27
| Ede, Netherlands
| 
|-
| Win
| align=center| 1–0
| Jordi Vinyals
| Submission (armbar)
| Shooto Belgium: Genesis
| 
| align=center| 1
| align=center| 1:37
|Hainaut, Belgium
| 
|-

See also
 List of current UFC fighters
 List of male mixed martial artists

References

External links

1987 births
Living people
Dutch male kickboxers
Dutch male mixed martial artists
Light heavyweight mixed martial artists
Mixed martial artists utilizing kickboxing
Mixed martial artists utilizing Brazilian jiu-jitsu
Dutch practitioners of Brazilian jiu-jitsu
People awarded a black belt in Brazilian jiu-jitsu
People from Moerdijk
Ultimate Fighting Championship male fighters
Sportspeople from North Brabant